Alexei Abrikosov may refer to:

 Alexei Abrikosov (physicist) (1928–2017), Soviet, Russian and American theoretical physicist
 Alexei Abrikosov (confectioner), Russian entrepreneur and manufacturer
 Aleksey Abrikosov (1875–1955), Russian/Soviet pathologist